Saša Mrkić (born 16 December 1967) is a Serbian football manager and former player.

Playing career
A defender, Mrkić spent eight seasons with Radnički Niš in two spells between 1988 and 2001. He also played abroad in Bulgaria.

Managerial career
After hanging up his boots, Mrkić served as manager of Radnički Niš on several occasions.

References

External links
 
 

1967 births
Living people
Yugoslav footballers
Serbia and Montenegro footballers
Serbian footballers
Association football defenders
FK Radnički Niš players
FK Obilić players
PFC CSKA Sofia players
Yugoslav First League players
First League of Serbia and Montenegro players
Serbia and Montenegro expatriate footballers
Expatriate footballers in Bulgaria
Serbia and Montenegro expatriate sportspeople in Bulgaria
Serbian football managers
FK Sloga Kraljevo managers
FK Radnički Niš managers
Serbian SuperLiga managers